Wemding is a town in the Donau-Ries district of Bavaria, Germany. Wemding is situated on the edge of the Ries meteorite crater in the Geopark Ries.

Wemding is the location of the Zeitpyramide (Time pyramid), a public art work begun in 1993 and scheduled to be completed in 3183.

Notable people
Leonhart Fuchs (1501–1566), born in Wemding, physician and botanist. The botanical genus Fuchsia is named in his honour.
Veit Amerbach, also Vitus Amerpachius, (1503–1557), born in Wemding, was a theologian, scholar and humanist.
Luitgard Im  (1930–1997), born and died in Wemding, theater and film actress.

References